Vilvoorde (historically known as Filford in English) is a Belgian municipality in the Flemish province of Flemish Brabant. The municipality comprises the city of Vilvoorde proper with its two outlying quarters of Koningslo and Houtem and the small town of Peutie. The nickname for inhabitants of Vilvoorde is Pjeirefretters (horse eaters) because horse meat (specially steak) is a beloved food in Vilvoorde.

The official language of Vilvoorde is Dutch.  There is a French-speaking minority of about 33.7%, concentrated especially in the Koningslo and Beauval quarter bordering Brussels. The French-speaking minority is represented by 3 members on the 33-seat local council. The city is also home to a large Spanish minority. In the center of the city, 1 out of 10 inhabitants have Spanish nationality and the proportion of Belgians with Spanish roots is even greater.  Most immigrated after  World War II, from Peñarroya-Pueblonuevo in Andalusia. There is also a large Moroccan community, and many smaller communities of more recent immigrants including Turks, Macedonians and Portuguese.

From 2000 until August 1, 2007, the mayor of Vilvoorde was former Belgian prime minister Jean-Luc Dehaene. The mayor since 2013 is Hans Bonte, also a member of the federal House of Representatives.

History

Origins
The Nervii, and later the Romans, probably already settled in this strategic place near the river Zenne.  The name Filfurdo was first mentioned in a 779 document whereby Pippin of Herstal ceded this territory to the Abbey of Chèvremont, near Liège.  This name presumably derived from the word equivalents villa  at the ford or river crossing.

Middle Ages
In the 12th century, a small town started to grow, which quickly became a target for the ambitions of the dukes of Brabant and lords of Grimbergen.  Henry I, Duke of Brabant granted the city its charter of rights as soon as 1192, mainly to ensure the support of the inhabitants against powerful neighbouring Flanders. The rights to build defensive walls and to export its products gave Vilvoorde a great economic boost, driven mostly by the cloth industry.  In the 14th century, thanks to its position on the Zenne, Vilvoorde became an important military centre and could compete against Leuven and Brussels for the title of most important city in Brabant.

15th century until now

From the 15th to the 19th century, however, Vilvoorde suffered a prolonged decline, mainly because of the competition from Brussels, a general malaise in the textile industry, and the result of epidemics and wars, both political and religious.

The translator of the Bible into English, William Tyndale, was executed here in October 1536. In 1597 Anna Utenhoven, an Anabaptist accused of heresy, was buried alive at Vilvoorde – the last of the Protestants suffering martyrdom for their faith in the history of the Habsburg Netherlands. Anthony van Stralen, Lord of Merksem and Jan van Casembroot both were executed in Vilvoorde.

The advent of the Industrial Revolution in the late 18th century was a godsend to Vilvoorde, which could quickly capitalize on its proximity to Brussels and its good transportation infrastructure: the deepening of the canals around 1830 and the advent of the railways in 1835.  Soon, the medieval buildings gave way to newer and better constructions.  The 1489 city hall was replaced by the neo-classical building we see today.

In the 1920s, the canal was broadened and deepened again, lined with new industrial zones, and an inland port was built to receive the freightliners.  Following its liberation by the British in 1944, Vilvoorde was administered by a joint British and Belgian municipality, with temporary British and Belgian Mayors, Lt Col (then Major) JME Howarth Esq and (Later Prof.) Robert Senelle, before transferring back to a civilian administration.  Vilvoorde became (and still is) one of the largest industrial areas around Brussels, with a population that grew to five times what it was 150 years earlier.  The recent economic crises have hit the city hard, especially when Renault closed its doors in 1997.  The service industry is now taking the lead in 21st century Vilvoorde.

Local government
Mayors of Vilvoorde:
 1983–1993: Laurent Moyson (CVP)
 1994–2000: Willy Cortois (VLD)
 2001–2007: Jean-Luc Dehaene (CD&V)
 2007–2012: Marc Van Asch (CD&V)
 Since 2013: Hans Bonte (SP.A)

Sights

The neo-classical city hall and a covered market hall can be found on the main city square.
The statue of a Brabant horse can be found nearby, commemorating the long tradition of horse trading in Vilvoorde.
The Kijk-Uit house dates from the 15th or 16th century.
The city also has interesting churches, including the Onze-Lieve-Vrouwekerk (Church of Our Lady) that was started in the 14th century, and the basilica of Onze-Lieve-Vrouw-ten-Troost (Our Lady of Consolation), built in the 17th-century Baroque style and adjoining the cloister of the Carmelites.
Vilvoorde also has its fair share of parks, such as the Hanssenspark with English gardens and the Domein Drie Fonteinen (the "Domain of the Three Fountains"), which boasts both English and French gardens.
The Vilvoorde Viaduct, part of the Brussels beltway.

Events

Like many other Belgian cities, Vilvoorde has a week-long carnival, which takes place every year in the week of Shrove Tuesday (end of February – beginning of March).
Every year, on the Monday three weeks after Easter, a very popular yearly market ("jaarmarkt") is held which features several competitions and exhibitions of farm animals (horses, cows, poultry, ...), and which coincides with the start of the yearly, week-long  fair featuring plenty of attractions for children.

Famous inhabitants
Jancko Douwama, a Frisian nobleman who fought to free Friesland from Saxon rule, was imprisoned by the Emperor Charles V in Vilvoorde castle from 1523 until his death in 1533
Jan van Essen and Hendrik Vos (d. 1523), shortly before becoming the first Lutherans executed by the Roman Catholic Church, were imprisoned in Vilvoorde in 1523
William Tyndale (1494–1536), English scholar and Bible translator, was strangled and burnt in Vilvoorde, on October 6, 1536, the traditional date, after having been charged with heresy
Jean-François Portaels, orientalist painter (1818–1895)
Jean-Luc Dehaene (1940–2014), former Belgian Prime Minister, MEP and vice-chair of the Convention on the Future of Europe
Danny Devos (b. 1959), artist working in body art and performance art
Francis Heylighen (b. 1960), scientist researching complex systems
Pascal Duquenne (b. 1970), actor
Yannick Carrasco (b. 1993) was raised in Vilvoorde.
Jan Baptist van Helmont (1580–1644), pioneer of chemistry
Paul Panda Farnana (1888 – 12 May 1930), Congolese intellectual and activist
Amelie Lens (b. 1990), DJ and producer

Twin cities
: Ennepetal
: Maubeuge
: Middelburg
: Peñarroya-Pueblonuevo, Córdoba
: Komatsu, Ishikawa

See also 
Brussels-Halle-Vilvoorde electoral district

References

External links

Official website – Only available in Dutch

 
Municipalities of Flemish Brabant